William Anthony Toomey (born January 10, 1939) is a former American track and field competitor and the 1968 Olympic decathlon champion.

He won 23 of the 38 decathlons he competed in, scoring over 8,000 points a dozen times.  He was on the cover of the October 1969 issue of Track and Field News.

Toomey was head coach in track and field at the University of California at Irvine in the early 1970s. Before that he worked as a television broadcaster and marketing consultant.

Toomey also competed in Masters Track and Field.

References

External links

 Bill Toomey. mtsac.edu
 

1939 births
American male decathletes
athletes (track and field) at the 1967 Pan American Games
athletes (track and field) at the 1968 Summer Olympics
Colorado Buffaloes men's track and field athletes
James E. Sullivan Award recipients
living people
medalists at the 1965 Summer Universiade
medalists at the 1967 Pan American Games
medalists at the 1968 Summer Olympics
Olympic gold medalists for the United States in track and field
Pan American Games gold medalists for the United States
Pan American Games medalists in athletics (track and field)
sports coaches from California
Track & Field News Athlete of the Year winners
track and field athletes from Philadelphia
UC Irvine Anteaters track and field coaches
universiade gold medalists for the United States
universiade medalists in athletics (track and field)
Worcester Academy alumni
world record setters in athletics (track and field)